Michelle Stafford (born September 14, 1968) is an American actress, screenwriter and producer. She currently plays Phyllis Summers on the CBS daytime soap opera The Young and the Restless, for which she has won two Daytime Emmy Awards. In 2013, Stafford created and starred in her own comedy web series, The Stafford Project. She also played Nina Reeves on the ABC daytime soap opera General Hospital.

Early life
Stafford was born in Chicago, Illinois. Her parents moved her and her older sister, Janine, to Montrose, California, where she was raised. After graduating from high school, Stafford chased after her dream of modeling.

Career
In 1990 Stafford was cast in Fox soap opera Tribes. The show was canceled after 3-month airing on Fox. She later appeared in two plays directed by Charles Durning in Los Angeles stage, and co-starred in several small films.

In October 1994, Stafford began what was supposed to be a short term role of Phyllis Summers on the American CBS Daytime soap opera The Young and the Restless; however, her work impressed the producers and she was placed on contract.  In 1997, Stafford left the series to pursue other career opportunities, and she was replaced by Sandra Nelson. In 1997 she was cast in Aaron Spelling primetime soap opera Pacific Palisades as lead character, but show was canceled after 13 episodes. She later guest-starred in Two Guys and a Girl, Diagnosis: Murder, and JAG. In film, Stafford appeared in 1999 thriller Double Jeopardy opposite Ashley Judd.

In July 2000, Stafford was brought back to the soap opera by former head writer Kay Alden. From December 2006 to February 2007, Stafford played dual roles on Y&R, portraying Sheila Carter, formerly played by Kimberlin Brown (Sheila had plastic surgery to look like Phyllis). In May 2013, it was announced that Stafford would be exiting the soap opera after sixteen years in the role. Stafford later confirmed that her final scenes would air sometime that August. Stafford exited the series on August 2, 2013.

In 2004, Stafford was a hockey correspondent for The Best Damn Sports Show Period. Stafford starred in Lifetime movie Like Mother, Like Daughter in 2007. In 2007, Stafford appeared on Tyra Banks' talk show to help Tyra through "soap opera school." In 2012 she appeared as Lauren on the web series The Grove, created by Crystal Chappell. She also guest-starred in Frasier, Charmed, and Ringer. She subsequently launched her web series, The Stafford Project, based on her personal life and struggles, with the first episode premiering on her YouTube Channel on August 5, 2013. The series received positive reviews from critics. Michael Logan of TV Guide appreciated the web series, calling it "terrific and audacious" and saying that "there's never a dull moment in the life of Michelle Stafford". Jamey Giddens of the entertainment website Zap2it said that Stafford is "as viable and fiery as ever", calling The Stafford Project "insanely-funny".

In 2014, Stafford returned to daytime television with the role of Nina Clay, the wife of Dr. Silas Clay (Michael Easton) on the ABC soap opera, General Hospital. Stafford's long-rumored addition to the cast was made official when her character Nina, the presumed-dead wife of Silas, suddenly appeared at the very end of the episode on May 1, 2014. In 2015, she co-starred alongside Tom Sizemore in the independent film Durant's Never Closes.

In 2016, Stafford launched a skincare product line called Skin Nation. The products are said to be organic, natural, gluten free, and certified cruelty-free by People for the Ethical Treatment of Animals (PETA). In 2019, it was announced that she would leave General Hospital as Nina Reeves and reprise her role of Phyllis Summers on The Young & the Restless.

Personal life
Stafford's first child, a daughter, Natalia Scout Lee Stafford, was born via a gestational surrogate in December 2009. In October 2015, Stafford had a second child, Jameson Jones Lee Stafford, a son.

Filmography

Film

Television

Awards and nominations

See also
 List of longest-serving soap opera actors

References

External links

Michelle Stafford's Website

1968 births
Actresses from Chicago
American Scientologists
American soap opera actresses
Daytime Emmy Award winners
Daytime Emmy Award for Outstanding Lead Actress in a Drama Series winners
Daytime Emmy Award for Outstanding Supporting Actress in a Drama Series winners
Living people
20th-century American actresses
American film actresses
American television actresses
21st-century American actresses
Web series producers